Charlie Yeung Choi-Nei (born 23 May 1974), is a Hong Kong actress. She was first noticed after appearing in a commercial with Aaron Kwok. Since then she has participated in the music videos of artists such as Hacken Lee, Jacky Cheung and made a number of films, most famously with Tsui Hark (The Lovers, Love in the Time of Twilight, Seven Swords) and Wong Kar-wai. She retired her career in 1997, but has since returned in 2004 in New Police Story.

Career
In 1992, she was signed on to be a singer with EMI (Hong Kong). After releasing a couple of albums with some success (she won the TVB Jade Solid Gold (1993)'s Gold Award of "The Best New Female Singer"), she made her feature-film debut in Wong Kar-wai’s arthouse martial arts film Ashes of Time alongside superstars such as Leslie Cheung, Tony Leung Chiu-wai and Brigitte Lin.

In 1994, she made her first collaboration with director Tsui Hark in the film The Lovers (梁祝). Yeung was cast as the female lead, Zhu Yingtai opposite Nicky Wu's Liang Shanbo. Her performance received widespread critical acclaim, rising Yeung to stardom. The film today has been hailed as Yeung's most representative work to date.

Between 1994 and 1997, she was arguably the popular artist in Hong Kong, with her appearing everywhere from magazines, posters and movies.

However, in 1997 she called it quits and retired from the industry to start an image consultant business with her Singaporean lawyer-boyfriend in Malaysia.

In 2004, after a failed relationship and business, she made her comeback as the lead actress in Jackie Chan's New Police Story. Following that, she collaborated once again with Tsui Hark in the martial arts movie Seven Swords and starred alongside Andy Lau in the love movie All About Love. She later co-starred in the film After This Our Exile opposite Aaron Kwok. She has made plans to appear in a sequel to Seven Swords.

Personal life
Yeung met her long-time boyfriend, a Singaporean lawyer Khoo Shao Tze in 1993, but split up in 2004 for a period of time. They reportedly got back together in 2011. Yeung and Khoo were married on 2 November 2013. In early January 2017, she and Khoo announced that they are expecting. On 27 April 2017, Charlie gave birth to twin boys, Ignatius and Aloysius.

Filmography
Hello Tapir (2019)
Little Q (2019)
Cold War 2 (2016)
Kung Fu Jungle (2014)
Christmas Rose (2013 - directorial debut)
Catching Monkey (2012)
Cold War (2012)
Floating City (2012)
Sleepwalker (2011)
Wind Blast (2010)
37 (2010)
Bangkok Dangerous (2008)
After This Our Exile (父子) (2006)
All About Love (再説一次我愛你) (2005)
Seven Swords (七劍) (2005)
New Police Story (新警察故事) (2004)
Tarzan (1999) [voice, Cantonese dub]
Task Force (熱血最強) (1997)
The Intimates (自梳女) (1997)
Downtown Torpedoes (神偷諜影) (1997)
A Chinese Ghost Story: The Tsui Hark Animation (小倩) (1997) [voice]
The Wedding Days (完全結婚手冊) (1997)
Dr. Wai in "The Scripture with No Words" (冒險王) (1996)
Young Policemen in Love (逃學戰警) (1995)
Fallen Angels (墮落天使) (1995)
High Risk aka Meltdown (鼠膽龍威) (1995)
Love in the Time of Twilight (花月佳期) (1995)
How Deep Is Your Love (霓虹光管高高掛之女子公寓) (1994)
Ashes of Time (東邪西毒) (1994)
The Lovers (梁祝) (1994)
What Price Survival (94獨臂刀之情) (1994)
Future Cops (超級學校霸王) (1993)

.

Discography
 Feeling of Love (1993)
 First Love (1994)
 Forget Me Not (1994)
 Smiling with Tears (1995)
 Mythology (1995)
 Do Whatever you Want (1996)

References

External links
 
 Charlie Yeung at Stareastasia 
 Charlie yeung fans club at  昨日今日永恆的采妮
 Hope Foundation 

Living people
1974 births
Hong Kong film actresses
Taiwanese emigrants to Hong Kong
20th-century Hong Kong women singers
Actresses from Taipei
Musicians from Taipei
Hong Kong people of Taiwanese descent
20th-century Taiwanese actresses
21st-century Taiwanese actresses
21st-century Hong Kong actresses
20th-century Hong Kong actresses
Taiwanese-born Hong Kong artists
Hong Kong idols